Barbora Krejčíková was the defending champion, having won the previous edition in 2019, but chose not to participate.

Zheng Qinwen won the title, defeating Aleksandra Krunić in the final, 7–6(7–5), 6–3.

Seeds

Draw

Finals

Top half

Bottom half

References

Main Draw

Macha Lake Open - Singles